Bruno Fattori (31 March 1891 – 15 October 1985) was an Italian poet. In 1936 he won a silver medal in the art competitions of the Olympic Games for his "Profili Azzurri" ("Azzurri Faces").

References

External links
 profile

1891 births
1985 deaths
Italian male poets
Olympic silver medalists in art competitions
20th-century Italian poets
Medalists at the 1936 Summer Olympics
20th-century Italian male writers
Olympic competitors in art competitions